Dlamini III (also known as Ladzandzukane and Sidvwaba Silutfuli) was a king or tiNgwenyama of the Swazi people who led them approximately between 1720 until 1744. He was the father to Ngwane III the first King of modern Swaziland. He is considered to be the connecting link between the Delagoa Bay Swazi settlements and the modern Swazi kingdom. His senior advisor was Chief Gadlela Mbokane. Dlamini settled his followers near the Pongola River where it cuts through the Lubombo Mountains. The early Swazi journeyed along with the Ndwandwe who are a closely related lineage.  
Dlamini was succeeded by Ngwane III his son with Queen LaYaka Ndwandwe. 
Dlamini's son Ngwane III, took over the chieftaincy and established Swazi settlements south of the Pongola River and when forced to abandon them, he moved his followers to cross back and settle on its northern banks. 
This marked the founding of modern Swaziland, and the first capital at Zombodze was established not very long after his ascent. Ngwane's brothers Ndlela and his uncles Shabalala and Mabuza were settled nearby.

References

18th-century monarchs in Africa
Swazi monarchs
Year of birth missing
Year of death missing